María del Carmen Díaz Mancilla (born July 15, 1970) is a retired long-distance runner from Mexico. She competed at the 1996 Summer Olympics in Atlanta, Georgia, where she finished in 33rd place in the women's marathon event. She set a personal best of 2:29:48 hours for the marathon in 1996.

International competitions

References

External links
 

 

1970 births
Living people
Mexican female long-distance runners
Mexican female marathon runners
Olympic athletes of Mexico
Pan American Games medalists in athletics (track and field)
Pan American Games gold medalists for Mexico
Athletes (track and field) at the 1996 Summer Olympics
Athletes (track and field) at the 1987 Pan American Games
Athletes (track and field) at the 1991 Pan American Games
Athletes (track and field) at the 1995 Pan American Games
World Athletics Championships athletes for Mexico
Pan American Games silver medalists for Mexico
Pan American Games bronze medalists for Mexico
Central American and Caribbean Games gold medalists for Mexico
Competitors at the 1990 Central American and Caribbean Games
Competitors at the 1993 Central American and Caribbean Games
Central American and Caribbean Games medalists in athletics
Medalists at the 1991 Pan American Games
Medalists at the 1995 Pan American Games
20th-century Mexican women